Jdaideh   is a Lebanese village in the Chouf District of the Mount Lebanon Governorate in Lebanon. It is known for its traditional architecture and role in regional trade. Its inhabitants are predominantly Druze.

References

Populated places in Chouf District
Druze communities in Lebanon